Euthyone purpurea is a moth of the subfamily Arctiinae first described by E. Dukinfield Jones in 1914. It is found in Brazil.

References

 

Lithosiini